This is a historical timeline of Portugal's Second Dynasty.

Second Dynasty: Aviz

14th century
1385
April – João I of Portugal acclaimed king by the Portuguese; Castilians do not accept this claim.
August 14 – Battle of Aljubarrota: João I defeats the Castilians and secures the throne.
1386 - Treaty of Windsor, an alliance between England and Portugal.
1394 – Henry the Navigator, son of king João I of Portugal, is born.

15th century
1415 – João I conquers the city of Ceuta in northern Africa.
1419 – Madeira Islands discovered by João Gonçalves Zarco and Tristão Vaz Teixeira.
1427 – Azores Islands discovered by Diogo Silves.
1433 – Duarte of Portugal becomes king.
1434 – Gil Eanes crosses the Bojador Cape: exploration of the African coast begins.
1438 – Afonso V of Portugal becomes king.
1444/1460 – discovery and settling of Cape Verde islands.
1481 – João II of Portugal becomes king.
1483 – João II executes Fernando, the third Duke of Braganza, and Diogo, the Duke of Viseu, putting an end to high nobility conspiracies.
1484 – Diogo Cão discovers the Congo river.
1491 – Bartolomeu Dias becomes the first European captain to cross the Cape of Good Hope.
1494 – The Treaty of Tordesillas signed between Spain and Portugal, dividing the colonisable world in two halves.
1495 – Manuel I of Portugal becomes king.
1498 – Vasco da Gama reaches India through navigation around Africa.

16th century
1500
Easter Day – Pedro Álvares Cabral discovers the already inhabited Brazil.
Diogo Dias discovered an island they named after St Lawrence after the saint on whose feast day they had first sighted the island later known as Madagascar
Manuel I orders expulsion or conversion of the Portuguese Jews.
Gaspar Corte-Real made his first voyage to Newfoundland, formerly known as Terras Corte-Real.
1502 - Miguel Corte-Real set out for New England in search of his brother, Gaspar.
João da Nova discovered Ascension Island.
Fernão de Noronha discovered the island which still bears his name.
1503 - On his return from the East,  Estevão da Gama discovered Saint Helena Island.
1506 - Tristão da Cunha discovered the island that bears his name. Portuguese sailors landed on Madagascar.
1509 - The Gulf of Bengal crossed by Diogo Lopes Sequeira. On the crossing he also reached Malacca.
1510 - Conquest of Goa by Afonso de Albuquerque.
1511 - Conquest of Malacca by Afonso de Albuquerque.
1512 - António de Abreu discovered Timor island and reached Banda Islands, Ambon Island and Seram. Francisco Serrão reached the Moluccas.
1513 - The first trading ship to touch the coasts of China, under Jorge Álvares and  Rafael Perestrello later in the same year.
1515 - Afonso de Albuquerque captures the Kingdom of Hormuz.
1517 - Fernão Pires de Andrade and Tomé Pires were chosen by Manuel I of Portugal to sail to China to formally open relations between the Portuguese Empire and the Ming Dynasty during the reign of the Zhengde Emperor.
1521 – João III of Portugal becomes king.
António Correia captures Bahrain, which is under Portuguese rule until 1602.
1526 - Jorge de Meneses reaches New Guinea for the first time.
1542 – Portuguese explorers Fernão Mendes Pinto, Francisco Zeimoto and António Mota are the first Europeans to land in Japan.
1557- Macau given to Portugal by the Emperor of China as a reward for services rendered against the pirates who infested the South China Sea.
Sebastião of Portugal becomes king.
1568 – King Sebastião of Portugal comes of age and takes control of government.
1569
Plague epidemic in Portugal. 60,000 people die in Lisbon alone.
Nagasaki, Japan, is open to Portuguese traders.
1570
Luís de Camões returns to Lisbon from the Orient.
Goa, in Portuguese India, is attacked by a coalition of Indian forces, but these are defeated by Portuguese Vice-Roy Luís de Ataíde, Count of Atouguia.
1578
Portuguese troops utterly defeated in Africa, in the battle of Alcácer Quibir ; king Sebastião disappears in the battle never to be seen again.
Cardinal Henrique I of Portugal becomes king.
1579 - Cortes in Lisbon.
1580
Cortes in Almeirim.
King Cardinal Henrique I of Portugal dies.

See also
History of Portugal
Timeline of Portuguese history
First Dynasty: Burgundy (12th to 14th century)
Third Dynasty: Habsburg (Spanish rule) (16th to 17th century)

References

Second Dynasty
Kingdom of Portugal

de:Zeittafel Portugal
ru:Португалия: Даты Истории